Self-Help is the second album released by the metalcore band Spitfire. It was released on February 28, 2006, through Goodfellow Records.

Track listing

Meat Market - 3:12
Go Ape - 2:31 
Life and Limb - 2:13
Dear John - 2:56
Leap of Faith - 2:59
U.V. I.V. - 4:23
The Great White Noise - 2:17
Comfort (The Iceman Cometh) - 4:00
The Suicide Cult is Dead - 2:30
Kings of the Food Chain - 2:02
Ohm Driver - 4:34

Personnel

 Matt Beck - guitar
 Chris Raines (ex-Norma Jean) - drums 
 Scottie Henry (ex-Norma Jean) - Guitar
 Jon Spencer - vocals 
 Dan Tulloh - bass
 Andreas Magnusson - Producer

References

2006 albums
Spitfire (American band) albums